Alwyn Scott is an American journalist. In 2010, he was named as a finalist for the Pulitzer Prize for editing a series of articles investigating the shutdown and sale of Washington Mutual, the largest U.S. bank to fail, and the foreclosure crisis. He has won numerous awards for writing and editing.

Scott is managing editor of the Puget Sound Business Journal, a weekly newspaper based in Seattle, Washington. He was the business projects reporter for The Seattle Times, a news editor at The Wall Street Journal in Brussels, a news editor and bureau chief for Dow Jones Newswires in London and Bangkok, and has written for numerous publications.

His work has focused on the economic and social effects of globalization and trade.

References 

American male journalists
Living people
Year of birth missing (living people)